The final of the women's 800 metre freestyle event for the 1976 Summer Olympics was held on July 25, 1976, in Montreal, after the preliminary heats on July 24, 1976.

Results

Heats
Heat 1

Heat 2

Heat 3

Final

References

Swimming at the 1976 Summer Olympics
1976 in women's swimming
Women's events at the 1976 Summer Olympics